Piersk  is a village in the administrative district of Gmina Krzymów, within Konin County, Greater Poland Voivodeship, in west-central Poland.

The village has a population of 100.

The Biechowy Ferry, a cable ferry, crosses the River Warta between Biechowy and Piersk.

References

Piersk